Eddy Finé (born 20 November 1997) is a French cyclist, who currently rides for UCI WorldTeam .

Major results

Road
2019
 1st Stage 3 Le Tour de Savoie Mont Blanc
 5th Overall Tour du Jura
2022
 6th Grand Prix du Morbihan

Grand Tour general classification results timeline

Cyclo-cross

2014–2015
 1st  National Junior Championships
 2nd Nommay Juniors
 Junior Coupe de France
3rd Sisteron
2015–2016
 Under-23 Coupe de France
3rd Flamanville
2016–2017
 Under-23 Coupe de France
3rd Bagnoles-de-l'Orne
2017–2018
 Under-23 Coupe de France
2nd Besançon
3rd La Meziere
3rd Jablines
2018–2019
 2nd Overall Under-23 Coupe de France
1st Razès
2nd Pierric
 2nd National Under-23 Championships
 UCI Under-23 World Cup
2nd Bern
  Under-23 DVV Trophy
2nd Koppenbergcross
 3rd Jablines

References

External links

1997 births
Living people
French male cyclists
Cyclo-cross cyclists
Sportspeople from Isère
Cyclists from Auvergne-Rhône-Alpes
21st-century French people